The Life & Times of Tim is an American adult animated sitcom created by Steve Dildarian for HBO. It premiered on September 28, 2008. The series is about a hapless man in his mid-20s named Tim (voiced by Dildarian) who lives in New York City with his girlfriend Amy. Throughout the series, Tim constantly finds himself in increasingly awkward situations in both his work and personal life.

The first season aired in 2008 and has since been aired in numerous countries, and has developed a cult following. The second season debuted on February 19, 2010 on HBO. On June 4, 2010, HBO announced it was canceling the show. There were rumors that it was going to be picked up by another network. On 16 August 2010, it was announced HBO had reversed their original decision to cancel the show, and as a result, a third season was ordered. Season 3 of The Life and Times of Tim premiered on December 16, 2011.

On April 20, 2012, HBO cancelled the series after three seasons.

The theme song is "I'll Never Get Out of This World Alive" performed by country music star Hank Williams.

Production
It is the first HBO animated original since Todd McFarlane's Spawn, which aired from 1997 to 1999. It was originally developed for Fox in 2007, but was instead picked up by HBO for 10 episodes. The first season ran from September 28, 2008 to November 30, 2008 on HBO.

Dildarian, in addition to providing the voice of Tim, serves as the series' executive producer. Dildarian is most notable for his famous "Budweiser Lizards" campaign. He is also known for his animated short Angry Unpaid Hooker, which was awarded the Best Animated Short at the 2006 Comedy Arts Festival in Aspen and is the basis for The Life & Times of Tim. Tom Werner (That '70s Show, 3rd Rock from the Sun, and The Cosby Show), Jimmy Miller (Talladega Nights: The Ballad of Ricky Bobby and Borat) and Mike Clements executive produce as well.

The show aired its last original episode on February 17, 2012. HBO has canceled the series.

Cast
 Steve Dildarian as Tim, the title character and protagonist. Tim is an unassuming white-collar worker for "Omnicorp", a fictional corporation in New York City. Although well-meaning, he almost always finds himself in greatly embarrassing scenarios, often as a consequence of bad judgment or lying.
 MJ Otto as Amy, Tim's long-suffering girlfriend.
 Nick Kroll as Stu, Tim's stoner best friend and co-worker.
 Matt Johnson as Rodney, Tim's other friend, assistant to The Boss, Staten-Island guido-type, and Stan, a constantly angry, vulgar Omnicorp employee.
 Peter Giles as The Boss (aka Percy Davis), the self-absorbed head of OmniCorp.
 Bob Morrow as Debbie the Prostitute; Gay Gary; additional characters. Alan Tudyk took over as the voice of Debbie in season 3.

Julianne Grossman, Edie McClurg, Andrew Daly, Jon Daly, Kari Wahlgren, Brian Scolaro, Melanie Lynskey, Jamie Denbo, Rick Gomez, and Eddie Pepitone provide additional voices in various episodes.

Guest voices have included Bob Saget as Tim's coworker Party Marty; Jeff Garlin as Stu's dad; Cheri Oteri as Bashko's daughter Blobsnark; Daniel Tosh as Theo the "Internet Technology" guy; Trevor Moore as Larry, owner of "Larry's Bras & Hooker Outfits"; Aziz Ansari; Elliott Gould as Dr. Fishman; Bob Odenkirk as the "Bathroom Guy"; Marc Wootton as Ringmaster; and Billy Dee Williams as himself, and Tim Meadows as himself.

Episodes
Each 30 minute episode consists of two 15 minute segments.

Series overview

Season 1: 2008

Season 2: 2010

Season 3: 2011–12

Release 
The first season was released on DVD on February 9, 2010, the second on December 13, 2011, and the third season on December 18, 2012.

International syndication

References

External links
 
 

2000s American adult animated television series
2000s American sitcoms
2010s American adult animated television series
2010s American sitcoms
2008 American television series debuts
2012 American television series endings
American animated sitcoms
American adult animated comedy television series
English-language television shows
HBO original programming
American television series revived after cancellation
Television series by Media Rights Capital
Television series by Warner Bros. Television Studios
Television shows set in New York City